Eupithecia trancasae is a moth in the family Geometridae. It is found in the region of Biobio (Nuble Province) in Chile. The habitat consists of the Northern Valdivian Forest Biotic Province.

The length of the forewings is about 7.5 mm for males and 8 mm for females. The forewings are white or pale greyish white, the basal portion with pale greyish brown scaling. The hindwings are white, with grey and greyish brown scaling. Adults have been recorded on wing in December and February.

Etymology
The specific name is based on the type locality.

References

Moths described in 1987
trancasae
Moths of South America
Endemic fauna of Chile